Wian is a given name. Notable people with the given name include:

Wian Conradie (born 1994), Namibian rugby union player
Wian du Preez (born 1982), South African rugby union player
Wian Vosloo (born 1995), South African rugby union player
Wian van Vuuren (born 1993), Namibian cricketer